The 2006–07 Vysshaya Liga season was the 15th season of the Vysshaya Liga, the second level of ice hockey in Russia. 29 teams participated in the league. Torpedo Nizhny Novgorod was promoted to the Russian Superleague.

First round

Eastern Conference

Western Conference

Playoffs

3rd place
 (W2) HC Dmitrov – (E2) Izhstal Izhevsk 2:2, 2:1 SO

External links 
 Season on hockeyarchives.info
 Season on hockeyarchives.ru

2006–07 in Russian ice hockey leagues
Rus
Russian Major League seasons